Franz Schuh (15 March 1891 – 13 June 1936) was an Austrian freestyle swimmer. He competed in two events at the 1912 Summer Olympics.

References

External links
 

1891 births
1936 deaths
Austrian male freestyle swimmers
Olympic swimmers of Austria
Swimmers at the 1912 Summer Olympics
Swimmers from Vienna